Birch Mountain, or Paokrung (Northern Paiute for "Mountain of Stone"), is one of the fifty highest peaks of California. Of the major peaks of the Palisades, it stands farthest from the Sierra Crest.

Judging by its few summit register entries, it is climbed far less than its nearby fourteener neighbors on the crest.
But its placement on the Sierra Peaks Section list adds to its appeal to peak baggers, and its low technical demand makes it a rewarding ski mountaineering destination.

See also
Mountain peaks of California
Palisades of the Sierra Nevada
Thirteener

References

Mountains of Inyo County, California
Mountains of the John Muir Wilderness
Mountains of Northern California